Juliet Kono is a Hawaiian poet and novelist.

Early life and education
Kono was born in 1943 in Hilo, Hawaii to Yoshinori and Atsuko Asayama; her grandparents were immigrants from Japan. One of her earliest memories is from the April 1 tsunami resulting from the 1946 Aleutian Islands earthquake; her family lost their home, which was near the water's edge where Liliuokalani Gardens is today, and were forced to live near her grandparents, who operated a small sugar cane plantation in Kaiwiki. She was raised as a Shin Buddhist, and her mother and grandmother were active members of Honpa Hongwanji Hilo Betsuin.

After graduating from Hilo High School, she moved to Honolulu, where she attended the University of Hawaii, but dropped out and started a family, then worked as a police radio dispatcher before she received her Bachelor (1988) and Master of Arts (1990) degrees from University of Hawaii at Manoa; as an adult student, she earned her BA and graduated with her son. Kono published her first book of poems, Hilo Rains, in 1988, as an undergraduate at Manoa.

Kono is retired and worked as an English instructor at Leeward Community College. She is married to David Lee, who was a fellow dispatcher.

Career
She took up writing while working at a former job as a police dispatcher, publishing as Juliet S. Kono. Kono has also taught at guest workshops for universities and colleges including Wellesley College and the Massachusetts Institute of Technology.

She is considered a member of the Bamboo Ridge group of writers and also is an ordained Buddhist minister.

Awards
Kono received a Creative Artist Exchange Fellowship from the Japan-United States Friendship Commission in 1998 and the Hawaii Award for Literature in 2005. Her novel Anshu: Dark Sorrow received the 2011 Ka Palapala Po'okela Book Award for Literature.

Bibliography
 (published as a special double issue of Bamboo Ridge: The Hawaii Writer's Quarterly, issues 37 and 38, Winter & Spring 1988)

 (published as a special double issue of Bamboo Ridge, issues 65 and 66)

 (special issue of Bamboo Ridge #96)

Works for young audiences

References

External links
 
 
  (2019)
Poems
  (from Hilo Rains)
  (from Tsunami Years)
  (from Tsunami Years)
  (from Tsunami Years)
  (from Tsunami Years)

Living people
21st-century American novelists
American women novelists
Novelists from Hawaii
20th-century American poets
21st-century American poets
American women poets
University of Hawaiʻi at Mānoa alumni
Wellesley College faculty
Massachusetts Institute of Technology faculty
20th-century American women writers
21st-century American women writers
Novelists from Massachusetts
Place of birth missing (living people)
American women academics
1943 births